Camilla Fors  (born 24 April 1969) is a Swedish footballer who played as a defender for the Sweden women's national football team. She was part of the team at the 1989 European Competition for Women's Football and inaugural 1991 FIFA Women's World Cup. At the club level she played for Jitex BK in Sweden.

References

External links
 

1969 births
Living people
Swedish women's footballers
Sweden women's international footballers
Place of birth missing (living people)
1991 FIFA Women's World Cup players
Women's association football defenders
20th-century Swedish women